Brainchild may refer to:
 Brainchild (band), a local supergroup from Youngstown, Ohio, 1969–1972
 Brainchild (Society of Soul album), 1996
 Brainchild (Circle of Dust album), 1994
 Fictional comic characters in the Marvel Universe:
 Brainchild (comics)
 Brain-Child,
 Brainchild, a project related to the industrial band Circle of Dust
 Brainchild, a 1981 novel by Andrew Neiderman
 Brainchild (TV series)

See also 
 Idea, colloquially referred to as a "brainchild"